Gibi District is one of four districts located in Margibi County, Liberia.

Districts of Liberia
Margibi County